Black Repartition (also known as Black Partition) was a revolutionary populist organization in Russia in the early 1880s.

Black Repartition (BR) was established in August-September 1879 after the split of Zemlya i volya (Land and Liberty). The name comes from the Russian countryside, where rumors circulated among peasants about the approaching repartition. "Chyornyi" in this context does not literally mean "black", but instead "general" or "universal".

Originally, the BR members shared the ideas of Zemlya i volya, renounced the necessity of political struggle and were against terror and conspiracy tactics of Narodnaya Volya. BR preferred propaganda and agitation ('agitprop') as their tactics. The organizers of BR’s central body in Saint Petersburg were Georgi Plekhanov, Pavel Akselrod, Osip Aptekman, Lev Deich, Vera Zasulich and others. This group organized a print shop and started publishing magazines Black repartition and Core (Зерно, or Zerno), simultaneously developing ties with students and workers. BR’s peripheral organs were active in Moscow, Kharkov, Kazan, Perm, Saratov, Samara and other cities.

After Plekhanov, Deich, Zasulich and some other BR members had emigrated in the beginning of 1880, Anatoly Bulanov, M.Reshko, K.Zagorsky, M.Sheftel and others replaced them as BR’s leaders. They opened a new printing-house in Minsk and widened their contacts with workers. BR’s central body moved to Moscow.

In the spring of 1880, BR members Yelizaveta Kovalskaya and Nikolai Schedrin organized the Worker’s Union of Southern Russia (Южнорусский рабочий союз, or Yuzhnorusskiy rabochiy soyuz), which comprised several hundreds of workers.

By this time, BR’s vision of revolution had changed in a number of ways.  The arrests in 1880-1881 significantly weakened the organization. Seeing the success of Narodnaya Volya, many BR members (Yakov Stefanovich, Bulanov and others) adopted its ideology. By the end of 1881, BR ceased to exist as an organization but separate BR clubs continued to operate up until the mid-1880s. Plekhanov, Deich, Zasulich along with other ex-members of BR embraced Marxism and created the first Russian Marxist organization called Emancipation of Labor (Освобождение труда, or Osvobozhdeniye truda) in Geneva in 1883.

References

Bibliography

1879 establishments in the Russian Empire
1881 disestablishments in the Russian Empire
Defunct socialist parties in Russia
Political parties established in 1879
Political parties disestablished in 1881
Political parties in the Russian Empire
Secret societies in Russia